Benjamin Wood Richards (November 12, 1797 – July 12, 1851) was an American lawyer and politician from Pennsylvania.

Biography
Richards was born in Batsto, New Jersey. He practiced law in Philadelphia, Pennsylvania, for many years and was active in the city's political scene.  He was the mayor of Philadelphia in 1829, replacing George M. Dallas, who resigned, and again from 1830 to 1832.  After leaving office, Richards resumed the practice of law, in which he continued until his death in Philadelphia in 1851.  He was interred at Laurel Hill Cemetery.

References

1774 births
1845 deaths
Burials at Laurel Hill Cemetery (Philadelphia)
Mayors of Philadelphia